Lori Emerson is an associate professor at the University of Colorado at Boulder and founder of the Media Archaeology Lab, a museum dedicated to obsolete technologies spanning from the late nineteenth century to the twenty-first century. She is known for her work in media archaeology, digital preservation, and digital archives.

Education 
Emerson has a B.A. from the University of Alberta (1998), and M.A. from the University of Victoria (2001) and an M.A. from the University of Buffalo (2004). In 2008 she earned a Ph.D. from the University of Buffalo. She joined the faculty at the University of Colorado at Boulder in 2008. As of 2022, she is an associate professor in the English department. She is also the founder of University of Colorado's Boulder's Media Archaeology Lab.

Career  
Emerson's areas of study include cultural studies, poetics and aesthetics, media archaeology, computer history, telecommunications networks, digital humanities and textuality, digital preservation, and digital archives. Emerson writes on and teaches experimental American and Canadian writing from the 20th and 21st centuries, the history of computing, and media theory. Her interest in the predecessors to ASCII art was part of a 2014 story in The Atlantic.

A component of Emerson's work centers on media archaeology or how to preserve digital memories. The Media Archaeology Lab she founded at the University of Colorado Boulder campus collects obsolete technologies in order to foster study and understanding of them. Carrying the motto "The past must be lived so that the present can be seen," the lab maintains all of these items in working order and allows them to be used at any time. It houses the world's first portable computer, the Osborne 1, as well as video game consoles, typewriters, audiovisual materials, and audio equipment. In exploring the ways in which the Media Archaeology Lab both differs from and adheres to the expectations of a traditional archive, Emerson and coauthor Libi Striegl describe that the Media Archaeology Lab "changes from year to year, depending on who is in the lab and what donations have arrived at our doorstep, and thus it undoes many assumptions about what archives as well as labs should be or do". This form of digital archaeology is a term used by Emerson to describe how people have interacted with computers over time. Her work establishing a media lab has been mentioned by other researchers in the field.

Selected publications 

Reviewed by the Emily Dickinson Journal, Digital Humanities Quarterly, Huffington Post, and others

Reviewed by the Journal of the Midwest Modern Language Association in 2014

Awards and honors 
In 2015, Emerson received an honorable mention from the Electronic Literature Organization for the N. Katherine Hayles Award for Criticism of Electronic Literature for her work Reading Writing Interfaces. In 2015, she received the ASSETT Teaching With Technology Award from the University of Colorado at Boulder for her work in the Media Archaeology Lab.

References

External links 
 Media Archaeology Lab
 Interview with Emerson, 11 October 2012

University at Buffalo alumni
University of Victoria alumni
University of Alberta alumni
University of Colorado Boulder alumni
University of Colorado Boulder faculty
Year of birth missing (living people)
Living people